Paracelsus is a five-part epic poem written by Robert Browning and published in 1835.

Structure
The poem is split into five parts called "Paracelsus Aspires", "Paracelsus Attains", "Paracelsus", "Paracelsus Aspires" and "Paracelsus Attains".

References

1835 poems
Poetry by Robert Browning